The Gibraltar Division 2 Cup is a special football tournament exclusively organized for clubs participating in the Second Division.

On 2 March 2017 the Gibraltar Football Association announced the signing of a sponsorship agreement with Chestertons Gibraltar, due to which the competition was renamed "The Chestertons Cup". Chestertons Gibraltar became the first sponsor of the competition since its inception. No tournament as held in 2018 due to redevelopments at Victoria Stadium, but the competition returned in the 2018–19 season.

Participating teams 2018–19

List of winners

Titles by club

See also 
 Gibraltar Second Division

References

External links 
Gibraltar FA

Football in Gibraltar